Ralph Karl Winter Jr. (July 30, 1935 – December 8, 2020) was a United States circuit judge of the United States Court of Appeals for the Second Circuit.

Education and career

Born in Waterbury, Connecticut, Winter graduated from the Taft School in 1953. He received his Bachelor of Arts degree from Yale University in 1957 and obtained his Bachelor of Laws from Yale Law School in 1960. He served as a law clerk for Judge Caleb Merrill Wright of the United States District Court for the District of Delaware from 1960 to 1961 and as a law clerk for Judge Thurgood Marshall of the United States Court of Appeals for the Second Circuit from  1961 to 1962. He served as a faculty member at Yale Law School from 1962 to 1982, as a research associate and lecturer from 1962 to 1964, as an assistant and associate professor from 1964 to 1968 and as a professor of law from 1968 to 1982. He was a consultant to the Subcommittee on Separation of Powers of the United States Senate Committee on the Judiciary from 1968 to 1972. He was a senior fellow at the Brookings Institution in Washington, D.C., from 1968 to 1970. He was a Guggenheim Fellow in Washington, D.C., from 1971 to 1972. He was an adjunct scholar at the American Enterprise Institute in Washington, D.C., from 1972 to 1981. He was a member of the Board of Trustees at Brooklyn Law School.

Winter advocated for limited government involvement in business matters. He also supported state control in such matters, as opposed to federal control.

Federal judicial service

President Ronald Reagan nominated Winter on November 18, 1981, to a seat on the United States Court of Appeals for the Second Circuit vacated by Judge Walter R. Mansfield. He was confirmed by the United States Senate on December 9, 1981, and received his commission on December 10, 1981. He served as Chief Judge from 1997 to 2000. He assumed senior status on September 30, 2000. He was a member of the Judicial Conference of the United States from 1997 to 2000. From 2003 to 2010, Winter also served as one of the three judges on the United States Foreign Intelligence Surveillance Court of Review. He died on December 8, 2020, from esophageal cancer.

Notable law clerks

 Steven G. Calabresi, clerked 1983–1984, also clerked for Robert Bork and Antonin Scalia
 Paul G. Mahoney, clerked 1984–1985, also clerked for Thurgood Marshall
 George T. Conway III, clerked 1987–1988
 Robert J. Giuffra Jr., clerked 1987–1988, also clerked for William Rehnquist
 Laura Ingraham, clerked 1991–1992, also clerked for Clarence Thomas
 Emmet Flood, clerked 1992–1993, also clerked for Antonin Scalia
 Florence Y. Pan, clerked 1994–1995
 Wendy E. Stone (Long), clerked 1996–1997, also clerked for Clarence Thomas

See also
 George H. W. Bush Supreme Court candidates

References

External links

 
 
 Court Says Regulator Exceeded Its Power

1935 births
2020 deaths
20th-century American judges
21st-century American judges
American legal scholars
Judges of the United States Court of Appeals for the Second Circuit
People from Waterbury, Connecticut
United States court of appeals judges appointed by Ronald Reagan
Taft School alumni
Yale Law School alumni
Yale Law School faculty